The Anjuman-i-Watan, Baluchistan, commonly called Anjuman-i-Watan, was a political party in British India based in the province of Baluchistan. It was led by Abdul Samad Khan Achakzai.

It was a member of the All India Azad Muslim Conference and opposed the partition of India.

The Anjuman-i-Watan allied itself with the Indian National Congress and also worked with the Anjuman-e-Ittehad-e-Balochan-wa-Balochistan, as well as its successor, the Kalat State National Party.

See also 
Opposition to the partition of India

References

Defunct political parties in India
History of Balochistan